The Ambies (or the Awards for Excellence in Audio, more formally) are a series of awards given in the podcast industry.  They are awarded by the Podcast Academy in two overall categories: Show Recognition and Talent Recognition. The winners, who receive a gold statue holding a microphone and wearing headphones, are selected by a vote from Podcast Academy members.  The awards and the Podcast Academy were established in 2020 with the inaugural ceremony held on May 16, 2021, hosted by Cameron Esposito.

History 
In February 2020, Hernan Lopez at Wondery announced that he and 10 peers had established a new non-profit group called the Podcast Academy.  The Podcast Academy is a member-based professional organization for podcasters.  It was modeled after other similar institutions in the entertainment industry with the intention of establishing an independent industry award for podcasting, initially called the Golden Mics.  When the Podcast Academy announced plans to hold the first award ceremony amidst the awards season of other entertainment areas, the name was changed to the Awards for Excellence in Audio, nicknamed the Ambies, and award was revealed to be a gold statue holding a microphone and wearing headphones. The term Ambies was derived from ambient sound, which is frequently used in audio recordings, and it has a similar sound to other awards such as the Emmys and Grammys.

Selection process 
Nominations are first recommended for consideration within a submission window, and then narrowed down to an official list of nominees for voting.  A minimum of three episodes published in the award year are required to be eligible for consideration.  From those recommendations, a panel of Podcast Academy members listen to podcasts for a period of time before selecting the nominees for voting in each category. Members of the Podcast Academy are organized into peer groups in order to vote on the winners from the selected nominees, which are announced at the live ceremony.

2021 Awards

Show Recognition

Talent Recognition

Criticism

References

External links 
 

Podcasting awards
Awards established in 2020